Yang Hsiu-chen (born 27 May 1968) is a Taiwanese former cyclist. She competed in two events at the 1988 Summer Olympics.

References

External links
 

1968 births
Living people
Taiwanese female cyclists
Olympic cyclists of Taiwan
Cyclists at the 1988 Summer Olympics
Place of birth missing (living people)
Cyclists at the 1994 Asian Games
Medalists at the 1994 Asian Games
Asian Games bronze medalists for Chinese Taipei
Asian Games medalists in cycling